Marco Corbelli (3 April 1970 – 6 May 2007), better known professionally as Atrax Morgue, was an Italian noise musician. Many of Atrax Morgue's early material was released on cassette, as part of the industrial/noise 'cassette underground' of the early 1990s. Often these cassettes were released on Corbelli's own Slaughter Productions label, some of which have now been reissued on CD-R. Throughout the late 1990s, Atrax Morgue released numerous CDs on prominent noise labels, such as Self Abuse Records, Release, Old Europa Cafe, RRRecords, Crowd Control Activities and Ars Benevola Mater.

Corbelli committed suicide by hanging on 6 May 2007. He was 37.

Partial discography 
Black Slaughter (Cass)  	 	Slaughter Productions   	1993
In Search of Death (Cass) 		Slaughter Productions  	1993
Necrosintesi (Cass) 		Slaughter Productions  	1993
Collection in Formaldeide (Cass) 		Slaughter Productions  	1994
Necrophiliac Experience (Cass) 		Slaughter Productions  	1994
New York Ripper (Cass, S/Sided, C60) 		Slaughter Productions  	1994
Woundfucker (Cass) 		Slaughter Productions  	1994
Basic Autopsy Procedure (Cass, S/Sided) 		Slaughter Productions  	1995
Catch My Agony (Cass, Ltd, C30) 		Slaughter Productions  	1995
Esthetik of a Corpse (Cass, C60) 		Slaughter Productions  	1995
Exterminate (Cass) 		Slaughter Productions  	1995
Homicidal Texture (Cass) 		Slaughter Productions  	1995
Pathophysiology (Cass) 		Old Europa Cafe  	1995
Untitled (Cass) 		Slaughter Productions  	1995
Autoerotic Death (Cass, Ltd) 		BloodLust!  	1996
Cut My Throat (CD) 		Slaughter Productions  	1996
Extended Autoerotic Death (Cass, Ltd, C60) 		BloodLust!  	1996
Forced Entry / N.C.W. (Cass) 		SSSM  	1996
Lesion 22 (Cass, Ltd) 		Less Than Zero  	1996
Sickness Report (CD) 		Release Entertainment  	1996
Studio - Live Material 1996 (Cass) 		Slaughter Productions  	1996
Sweetly (Cass, S/Sided, Ltd) 		Murder Release  	1996
Aminobenzolmessias (LP) 		abRECt  	1997
James Oliver Huberty (7") 		Self Abuse Records  	1997
Slush of a Maniac (CD) 		Crowd Control Activities  	1997
DeathShow (with Morder Machine) CD (Slaughter Productions, 1998)
Disconnected (CDr) 		Sin Organisation  	1998
Woundfucker (CD) 		AVA/ES1-Reset  	1998
Overcome (LP) 		Slaughter Productions  	1999
Esthetik of a Corpse (CDr) 		Slaughter Productions  	2000
Exterminate (CDr) 		Slaughter Productions  	2000
In Search of Death (CDr) 		Slaughter Productions  	2000
Paranoia (CD) 		Old Europa Cafe  	2000
Homicidal / Mechanic Asphyxia (CDr) 		Slaughter Productions  	2001
I Vizi Morbosi Di Una Giovane Infermiera (CDr) 		Slaughter Productions  	2001
Necrophiliac Experience / Necrosintesi (CDr) 		Slaughter Productions  	2001
New York Ripper (CDr) 		Slaughter Productions  	2001
Basic Autopsy Procedure / Homicidal Texture (CDr) 		Slaughter Productions  	2002
Collection in Formaldeide (CDr) 		Slaughter Productions  	2002
La Casa Dalle Finestre Che Ridono (CDr) 		Slaughter Productions  	2002
Pathophysiology (CDr) 		Transf/Order  	2002
Sweetly (CDr, Album) 		Spatter  	2002
Death - Orgasm Connector (CD) 		Slaughter Productions  	2003
No More (CD) Amplexus 2004
Her Guts (7", Ltd, Whi) 		BloodLust!  	2005
No More (CD) 		Ars Benevola Mater  	2005
Claustrophobic Introduction (CDr, Ltd, 155) 		Mind Terrorism Productions  	2006
Frustration (CDr, B/card) 		En.mi.ty Records  	2006
Inorganic Introduction Pt.II (File, MP3) 		Radical Matters  	2006
Negative Frequencies (CDr) 		Slaughter Productions  	2006
Pathophysiology (CDr) 		Old Europa Cafe  	2006

External links 
 Marco Corbelli on Discogs

1970 births
2007 suicides
Noise musicians
Italian experimental musicians
Suicides by hanging in Italy
2007 deaths
20th-century Italian male musicians
21st-century Italian male musicians
People from Sassuolo
Industrial musicians
Power electronics musicians
Cassette culture 1970s–1990s